A state by-election was held in Queensland on 13 October 2007 to fill the vacancy in the Legislative Assembly of Queensland electoral district of Brisbane Central, formerly held by Labor member and former Premier Peter Beattie, who resigned on 14 September 2007. The Liberal-National coalition failed to stand a candidate in the by-election. A total of six candidates stood in the election.

Grace Grace held the seat for Labor with slightly over 50% of the vote, negating the need for the count to go to preferences. In the absence of a Liberal-National coalition candidate, the party with the largest gains were The Greens, who scored a swing in their favour of 14.83%.

Results

See also
List of Queensland state by-elections

References

External links
All You Need To Know : 2007 Brisbane Central By-Election from Electoral Commission Queensland

2007 elections in Australia
Queensland state by-elections
2000s in Brisbane